Giovanni De Gregorio or de Gregorio may refer to:

 Giovanni De Gregorio (cardinal) (1729–1791)
 Giovanni De Gregorio (painter) (1579 or 1580–1656), from Satriano di Lucania, better known as Pietrafesa

See also
 Giovanni De Gregori or Gregoriis (fl. 1496–1527), printer from Forlì